Epie may refer to:
Epie language, spoken in Nigeria by the Epie-Atissa people
Gilles Epié (born 1958), French chef and restaurateur, youngest chef to receive a Michelin Star

See also
Eppie (disambiguation), a nickname or given name
Eppy (disambiguation)